The Ministry of Government and Justice of Panama (later the Ministry of Government) determines government policies and plans, as well as coordinates, directs and exercises administrative control over the provinces and indigenous regions in respect of their cultural patterns and integral development. Established in 1903, the ministry performs the following functions:

 Ensure the rights and guarantees of the inhabitants of the Republic.
 Intervene in the granting of pardons for political crimes, reductions of sentences and conditional liberties to criminals of common crimes, as established in numeral 12 of article 184 of the Political Constitution.
 Coordinate the administration of custody centers for adults and adolescents deprived of liberty and develop resocialization policies.
 Coordinate relations between provincial governments and interjurisdictional issues.
 Participate in the evaluation of the structure of the provinces and counties and the preparation of national legislation related to their administration.

Additionally, the ministry oversees the Panamanian National Police (PNP), National Maritime Service (SMN), and National Air Service (SAN). There are certain instances in which the Ministry of Government and Justice will work in tandem with the Office of the Attorney General of the Nation. However, the ministry is politically accountable to the President whereas the Office of the Attorney General is not a part of the executive branch.

In February 2010, the new administration led by President Ricardo Martinelli proposed the Ministry of Government and Justice to be divided in two new Ministries: The Ministry of Public Security (in charge of security policies and affairs, also oversight of security forces and intelligence agencies including the National Police, National Border Service, National Aeronaval Service and the National Immigration Service) and the Ministry of Government (an executive branch in charge of themes related with public governance and internal). The Ministry of Public Security was formally created on April 14 the same year with the passage of Law no 15 by the National Assembly proving for its creation. And, the Ministry of Government was formally created formally created on May 3 the same year with the passage of Law no 19.

List of ministers 
List of ministers

See also 
 Justice ministry
 Office of the Attorney General of the Nation (Panama)
 Politics of Panama

References 

Justice ministries
Government of Panama
1903 establishments in Panama